is a Japanese freestyle wrestler. In 2017, she won a gold medal at Paris World Wrestling Championships in 55 kg.

Awards
Tokyo Sports
Wrestling Special Award (2017)

References

External links 
 

World Wrestling Champions
Japanese female sport wrestlers
1999 births
Living people
Wrestlers at the 2018 Asian Games
Medalists at the 2018 Asian Games
Asian Games bronze medalists for Japan
Asian Games medalists in wrestling
World Wrestling Championships medalists
21st-century Japanese women